O.R.I.F., see Internal fixation

Urif, a  Palestinian village on the  West Bank